Netaji Nagar is a locality and part of South Kolkata and comes under the Jadavpur parliamentary area. It is a part of Tollygunge area. It is named after the famous freedom fighter Netaji Subhash Chandra Bose and a statue of Bose is placed on the road which is connected to Netaji Subhash Chandra Bose Road.

Geography

Police district
Netaji Nagar police station is in the South Suburban division of Kolkata Police. It is located at 9, Puratan Bazar, Hari Mohan Primary School, Kolkata-700092.

In 2014, Netaji Nagar police station was carved out of the jurisdiction of Patuli police station.

Patuli Women police station has jurisdiction over all police districts under the jurisdiction of South Suburban Division i.e. Netaji Nagar, Jadavpur, Kasba, Regent Park, Bansdroni, Garfa and Patuli.

Location and neighbourhood
It predominantly has lower to medium class residential area. Most of the people are Bengali Hindu refugee from East Pakistan, who were given land by government to rehabilitate them. They have settled here after 1947 partition of India. In the recent times people of all ethnicity including the old refugees live here. Starting from a refugee colony, the locality has grown both in size and facilities and has become one of the most Important localities of South Kolkata.

Recently, many Gujarati diaspora of Kolkata have preferred to live in this locality, who have shifted from prime Bhowanipore area of city and have also built a Jain temple in locality.

The PIN code for this area is 700040/92.

Education
Among educational institution are Netaji Nagar Day College, Netaji Nagar College for Women and Netaji Nagar Evening College, The Future Foundation School, Kolkata, Narmada School, Netaji Nagar Vidya Mandir & Netaji Nagar Balika Vidyalaya.

Transport 
The area is served by large arterial road named Netaji Subhash Chandra Bose Road, which connects to Tollygunj Metro Station on one end and Garia on other end with the closest one being Masterda Surya Sen metro station (Bansdroni).

Culture
There is cinema hall named Malancha nearby, which is also a major landmark.

References

Neighbourhoods in Kolkata
Memorials to Subhas Chandra Bose